Havrylivka is a village in Beryslav Raion (district) in Kherson Oblast of southern Ukraine, at about  northeast by east (NEbE) of the centre of Kherson city, on the right (western) bank of the Dnipro river. It belongs to Novooleksandrivka rural hromada, one of the hromadas of Ukraine.

The settlement came under attack by Russian forces during the Russian invasion of Ukraine in 2022 and was regained by Ukrainian forces in the beginning of October the same year.

Demographics
The settlement had 1,487 inhabitants in 2001, native language distribution as of the Ukrainian Census of the same year:
Ukrainian: 96.02%
Russian: 3.71%
Belarusian: 0.20%

References

Villages in Beryslav Raion